WPTC may refer to:

Former call sign of WKWP, a Christian radio station
A defunct radio station in Elsah, Illinois
World Pastry Team Championship, in Stéphane Tréand
Wireless Power Transfer Conference, in Online Electric Vehicle
 World Processing Tomato Council
Williamsport Preservation Training Center, under the National Park Service, in Matthew Jones House